BBC Radio 1 Live in Concert is a series of recordings of the BBC Radio 1 concert series BBC Radio 1 Live. The albums are licensed to Windsong International.

Albums
 BBC Radio 1 Live: Steve Hillage Live in Concert
 BBC Radio 1 Live in Concert (All About Eve album), by All About Eve
 BBC Radio 1 Live in Concert (Atomic Rooster album)
 BBC Radio 1 Live in Concert (Caravan album)
 BBC Radio 1 Live in Concert (Wishbone Ash album)
 BBC Radio One Live in Concert (Dexys Midnight Runners album)
 BBC Radio 1 Live in Concert (Echo & the Bunnymen album)
 BBC Radio 1 Live in Concert (The Fall album), by The Fall
 BBC Radio 1 Live in Concert (Hawkwind album)
 BBC Radio 1 Live in Concert (Lone Justice album)
 BBC Radio One Live in Concert (The Long Ryders album)
 BBC Radio 1 Live in Concert (The Michael Schenker Group album), by The Michael Schenker Group
 BBC Radio 1 Live in Concert (Nazareth album)
 BBC Radio One Live in Concert (New Model Army album)
 BBC Radio 1 Live in Concert (New Order album)
 BBC Radio 1 Live In Concert (Paice Ashton Lord album)
 BBC Radio 1 Live in Concert (Skids album), by Skids
 BBC Radio 1 Live in Concert (Steve Earle album)
 BBC Radio 1 Live in Concert (Stiff Little Fingers album)
 BBC Radio One Live in Concert (Thin Lizzy album)
 BBC Radio 1 Live in Concert (Ultravox album), by Ultravox
 BBC Radio 1 Live in Concert (XTC album)

See also
 Live at the BBC

BBC Radio 1